The Jonathan O. Cole Mental Health Consumer Resource Center is a consumer to consumer mental health organization.

The Cole Resource Center provides information about a wide range of mental disorders, as well as consultation on housing, health insurance, low cost medications, volunteer employment, and legal advocacy for mental health consumers. It was co-founded by Everett Page, Evie Barkin and Anne Whitman, Ph.D. Barkin and Whitman have publicly revealed that they have bipolar disorder, in line with the center's efforts to reduce the stigma of mental illness. It is located in the de Marneffe Building at McLean Hospital in Belmont, Massachusetts.

The center was named for Jonathan O. Cole, M.D., a professor of psychiatry at Harvard Medical School, and a senior consultant in psychopharmacology at McLean Hospital, and the founder of the Manic-Depressive & Depressive Association (MDDA)-Boston.

The center has helped to develop news stories, including collaborations with The Wall Street Journal, Time, The Boston Globe, and the Harvard Business Review. They have contributed to television segments on psychiatric issues for the Discovery Channel, 20/20 and Good Morning America.

See also
Psychiatric survivors movement
Recovery model
Self-help groups for mental health

References

External links

Mental health organizations in Massachusetts
Belmont, Massachusetts